Pentti Vikström (born 9 December 1951) is a Finnish archer. He competed in the men's individual and team events at the 1988 Summer Olympics.

References

External links
 

1951 births
Living people
Finnish male archers
Olympic archers of Finland
Archers at the 1988 Summer Olympics
People from Oulainen
Sportspeople from North Ostrobothnia